Necpaly is a village and municipality in Martin District in the Žilina Region of northern Slovakia.

Etymology
The name is derived from an adjective necpalý referring to a low density village ( - to push, to overcrowd, a negative verb necpať).

History
In historical records the village was first mentioned in 1266.

Manor house 
In the 19th century the chateau got under control of Franklins. The first member of the Franklins’ clan was Benjamin Franklin, an illegitimate son of Dionyz Justh and great-granddaughter of Benjamin Franklin.

Geography
The municipality lies at an altitude of 515 metres and covers an area of 42.172 km2. It has a population of about 826 people.

Municipal water power station

In summer 2007 the first municipal water power station in Slovakia started generating electricity which is in part used for the municipal office building needs and public lighting and in part supplied to the public grid. It is expected to have a yearly output of 160,000 kW. The construction, which cost 5 million Slovak crowns, should be profitable after five years of operation. Three more similar power stations are planned to be finished by the end of 2007 in Necpaly.

Resources

Villages and municipalities in Martin District